Vešter (in older sources also Bešter) is a settlement in the Municipality of Škofja Loka in the Upper Carniola region of Slovenia.

Geography
Vešter is an old clustered village east of Trnje along the road from Škofja Loka to Železniki. It stands on the left bank of the Selca Sora River with the settled area in the Vešter Plain, and Puštal Hill and Cavrn Hill rise north of the settlement.

Name
Vešter was attested in historical sources as Obernwester in 1291, Westreden in 1421, Westert in 1481, and Bestrad in 1500. The name Vešter is shortened from German Obernwester (literally, 'upper Vešter'). The neighboring village of Trnje was formerly called Wester, and so the epithet distinguished the two villages. The name Vešter is derived from the microtoponym Westerfeld ('western field', today Veštrsko polje), which stands west of the cluster of villages around Stara Loka; the corresponding Osterfeld ('eastern field', now the northern part of Škofja Loka) stood east of the built-up area, and there was also a Mittelfeld 'middle field' between the two.

History
There is an unexcavated hillfort on Puštal Hill, testifying to prehistoric settlement in the area. In the 13th century, Vešter belonged to the Gadmar District.

During the Second World War, the Partisans used the Vešter Mill (Veštrski mlin) south of the village, a structure attested since the 13th century, as an underground printshop. The building was burned by German forces on February 8, 1944, killing three Partisans. There is a memorial at the site.

Mass graves

Vešter is the site of three known mass graves from the period immediately after World War II. It contains the remains of six to 10 Home Guard soldiers and civilians that were released from the Loka Castle prison and then intercepted and murdered on their way home. It contains the remains of eight Home Guard soldiers that were taken from the Loka Castle prison and murdered. The abandoned and dilapidated Lovrec House stood at the site in 1945. The Cavrn Mass Grave is located on the slope of Cavrn Hill near a former Partisan bunker. It contains the remains of eight Home Guard soldiers that were taken from the Loka Castle prison and murdered.

References

External links

Vešter at Geopedia

Populated places in the Municipality of Škofja Loka